Boloria dia, the Weaver's fritillary or violet fritillary,  is a butterfly in the family Nymphalidae. The name Weaver's fritillary is in honor of Richard Weaver, an English insect collector who claimed to have obtained the specimen within ten miles of Birmingham around 1820. However, B. dia is uncommon in England and the few specimens known from there are thought to be from possibly accidental introductions.

Description
The adult is a small fritillary with typically chequered orange-brown upperside and a submarginal row of triangles and dots. The forewing is 16–17 mm long. The underside of the hindwing has a distinctive purplish band.

B. dia differs from the pearl-bordered fritillary in having a sharp angle to its hindwing (readily seen from underside when perched with wings closed). The similar Titania's fritillary has a less sharply-angled hindwing and only occurs at high altitude.

In Europe the larvae feed on Viola species (Viola odorata, Viola hirta, Viola canina, Viola reichenbachiana, Viola tricolor), and outside Europe on Prunella vulgaris and Rubus idaeus.

Distribution
Boloria dia is found in Europe, over the Caucasus east across the Palearctic to Mongolia. It is widespread and common across southern France. In Europe it occurs from northern Spain, Italy and Greece to Poland, the Balkans and Turkey. It is not found in Britain.

Subspecies
 Clossiana dia dia western Europe
 Clossiana dia alpina (Elwes, 1899)
 Clossiana dia calida (Jachontov, 1911)
 Clossiana dia disconota (Krulikovsky, 1909) central Europe and western Siberia
 Clossiana dia semota Tuzov, 2000
 Clossiana dia setania (Fruhstorfer, 1909)

Gallery

References

External links
Vlindernet 
Lepidoptera of Belgium
Butterflies of Europe

dia
Butterflies of Africa
Butterflies of Asia
Butterflies of Europe
Butterflies described in 1767
Taxa named by Carl Linnaeus